The Borough of Port Fairy was a local government area about  west-southwest of Melbourne, the state capital of Victoria, Australia. Its area was surrounded by the Shire of Belfast and the Southern Ocean.

History

Port Fairy was incorporated as the Belfast Municipal District on 1 July 1856, becoming a borough on 1 October 1863. On 27 May 1887, it was renamed Port Fairy.

On 23 September 1994, the Borough of Port Fairy was abolished, and along with the Shires of Belfast and Minhamite, parts of the Shires of Dundas, Mortlake, Mount Rouse, Warrnambool and the Tower Hill Reserve, was merged into the newly created Shire of Moyne.

Wards
The Borough of Port Fairy was not subdivided into wards, and the seven councillors represented the entire area.

Population

* Estimate in the 1958 Victorian Year Book.

References

External links
 Victorian Places - Port Fairy

Port Fairy Borough